From 1895 to 1929, streetcar strikes affected almost every major city in the United States.  Sometimes lasting only a few days, these strikes were often "marked by almost continuous and often spectacular violent conflict," at times amounting to prolonged riots and weeks of civil insurrection.

Following the 1929 New Orleans streetcar strike, less violent strikes persisted for decades, such as the Atlanta transit strike of 1950.  The rise of private automobile ownership limited its impact.

Tactics

Electrified streetcars posed an attractive target for striking unions like the Amalgamated Street Railway Employees of America.  Unlike factory buildings, streetcar routes and cars were spread out and difficult to protect. The routes went through the working class neighborhoods of cities; riders tended to be sympathetic to union causes.  Their overhead lines and physical tracks were vulnerable to sabotage.  And their function as transportation for workers in other industries opened the possibility of leveraging a transit strike into a general strike, as in the Philadelphia trolley strike and riots of 1910.

Streetcar strikes rank among the deadliest armed conflicts in American labor union history.  Samuel Gompers of the American Federation of Labor called the St. Louis Streetcar Strike of 1900 "the fiercest struggle ever waged by the organized toilers" up to that point, with a total casualty count of 14 dead and about 200 wounded, more than the Pullman Strike of 1894.  The casualty count for the San Francisco Streetcar Strike of 1907 saw 30 killed and about 1000 injured.

Despite the transit disruption, which sometimes lasted for months, and despite the fact that many of the casualties were passengers and innocent bystanders, "the strikers invariably enjoyed wide public support, which extended beyond the working class."

The owners' tactic was simply to keep the routes running.  To counter hostile crowds, the line owners turned to strikebreakers.  Foremost among them was James A. Farley (1874-1913), who specialized in streetcar strikes—he claimed to have broken 50—and was said to command an army of forty thousand scabs  to be deployed anywhere in the country.  Much of the violence of the 1907 San Francisco strike was attributable to Farley, who reportedly cleared $1 million there.  He was doing more than $10 million in business by 1914.

Examples 

Examples of American streetcar strikes include:  
 1889, Twin Cities, Minnesota
 1891, Detroit, Michigan, where strikers had the vocal support of Mayor Hazen S. Pingree, part of his administration's long successful struggle against local traction companies
 1895, Brooklyn, New York City, the first in which Farley was involved
 1896, Milwaukee
 1899, Cleveland, Ohio
 1900, St. Louis, where the dynamiting of streetcars was a "nightly occurrence" 
 1903, Los Angeles
 1907, San Francisco, California, with 31 killed and an estimated 1000 people injured
 1908, Pensacola, Florida
 1910, Columbus, Ohio
 1913, Buffalo, where two regiments of the National Guard were called out to quell a full day of rioting and mob violence, with several wounded by gunfire, and widespread property damage 

 1913, Indianapolis
 1916, Atlanta
 1916, Portland, Maine
 1917, the San Francisco United Railroads strike
 1917, Seattle and Tacoma streetcar employees
 1919, Los Angeles
 1919, Charlotte, North Carolina
 1920, Denver, Colorado, which left 7 dead and 80 wounded
 1929, New Orleans, Louisiana
 1934, Milwaukee
 1944, Philadelphia

Fiction
Scenes of streetcar strikes, and the friction between owners and workers, appear in contemporary fiction such as Theodore Dreiser's Sister Carrie of 1900 (based on Dreiser's own experience in a Toledo, Ohio strike), and William Dean Howells' A Hazard of New Fortunes of 1890.

References

Archives 
 Amalgamated Transit Union, Local 587 Records. 1941-2011. 15 cubic feet (17 boxes).
 Asahel Curtis photographs. 1881-1941. 5.46 cubic feet (13 boxes). 1,678 photographic prints.

 
 
Riots and civil disorder in the United States